Sonja Morawetz Sinclair (born December 3, 1921) is a Canadian journalist, author, and cryptographer. From the 1950s to the 1990s she worked independently for major Canadian publications including Time, Canadian Broadcasting Corporation, Maclean's, Chatelaine, Canadian Business, Financial Post, authored four books and worked as Director of Communication for Price Waterhouse. In June 2017 she was honoured by the  British government for her service as a World War II codebreaker for an Ottawa branch of Bletchley Park Signals Intelligence between 1943-1945. She kept her wartime intelligence service secret from her closest family and friends for over seven decades.

Personal life 
Sonja was born in Úpice, Czechoslovakia, on December 3, 1921, to parents Frida Glaser Morawetz and industrialist Richard Morawetz. She grew up in Prague. In late 1938 she fled Czechoslovakia through Nazi Germany to Great Britain. She spent a year at Badminton School in Bristol before moving to Canada. As a student at Trinity College, University of Toronto, she served as editor-in-chief of the Trinity Review.

Her sister-in-law Cathleen Synge Morawetz was a distinguished mathematician at NYU. Her brother Herbert Morawetz was also a notable chemist at NYU. Her brother Oskar Morawetz was a notable classical music composer.

World War II Codebreaker 
Between 1943 and 1945 Sonja worked as a World War II codebreaker for an Ottawa extension of Bletchley Park Signals Intelligence. She was sworn to secrecy and did not reveal her work to her or friends family for over 70 years. In 2017 she was awarded the Bletchley Park Commemorative Badge for her service.

Author 
I presume you can type: The mature woman's guide to second careers (1969)
Cordial but not cosy: A history of the Office of the Auditor General (1979)
Memoirs: The Making of a Peacemonger (co-authored with George Ignatieff) (1986)
Bata: Shoemaker to the World (co-authored with Thomas J. Bata) (1990)

Mikhail Baryshnikov defection 
In 1974 Sonja's family helped Mikhail Baryshnikov defect from the USSR. Baryshnikov sprinted away after a performance in downtown Toronto to a waiting getaway car that took him to a farm near Markham, Ontario. He stayed there for a couple of days until journalists caught up to him, at which point he moved to a cottage on Lake Muskoka owned by Sonja's family. He remained there until he was assured the Canadian government would not extradite him. Baryshnikov settled in New York City quickly thereafter.

References 

1921 births
Living people
20th-century Canadian journalists
20th-century Canadian non-fiction writers
20th-century Canadian women writers
Canadian women journalists
Canadian women non-fiction writers
Czechoslovak emigrants to Canada